Forward Township is the name of some places in the U.S. state of Pennsylvania:
Forward Township, Allegheny County, Pennsylvania
Forward Township, Butler County, Pennsylvania

Pennsylvania township disambiguation pages